The LG GR500 (LG Xenon) is a mobile phone manufactured by LG Electronics, which features a touch screen and QWERTY keyboard on AT&T's 3G network. It was released April, 2009, compared to 2007 for the first iPhone and 2008 for the first Android phone. It offers a flash for the 2.0 mega pixel camera, GPS, multi tasking, a menu or favorite contacts, and a microSD slot for music, pictures, and video. Voice dialing and video share are among the features on this phone. Newer models of the phone also include a front-facing camera for video chat, that is incapable of recording video or pictures. The LG Xenon does not have Wi-Fi capability.

Design
The LG Xenon comes in black, blue, red, and purple. It runs on an OS similar to its predecessor the LG Vu, and has a slide out QWERTY keyboard and resistive touch screen. Its keyboard has dedicated buttons for text and email messages. When opened, the phone is viewed in a wider aspect than when closed. A lock button on the right side allows the phone to be used while it is not open. The default themes are white with blue outlining, and black with red outlining.

References

See also
 List of LG mobile phones
 LG Electronics 
 LG Shine 
 LG Vu 
 AT&T
 Samsung Eternity, a competitor.
 Samsung Impression, a competitor.

GR500